Bactrodes is a genus of reduviids (assassin bugs). All known species are from South America.

Species
Bactrodes biannulatus Stål, 1862
Bactrodes femoratus (Fabricius, 1803)
Bactrodes misionensis Coscarón & Melo, 2003
Bactrodes multiannulatus Berg, 1884
Bactrodes spinulosus Stål, 1862

References

Reduviidae
Hemiptera of South America